KonoDam  is a gravity dam located in Kumamoto Prefecture in Japan. The dam is used for irrigation and power production. The catchment area of the dam is 161.1 km2. The dam impounds about 6  ha of land when full and can store 326 thousand cubic meters of water. The construction of the dam was started on 1958 and completed in 1959.

See also
List of dams in Japan

References

Dams in Kumamoto Prefecture